Coleophora teredo is a moth of the family Coleophoridae. It is found in southern Russia and central Asia. It occurs in desert-steppe biotopes.

Adults are on wing from May to June.

The larvae feed on the carpels of Anabasis aphylla.

References

teredo
Moths of Asia
Moths described in 1994